Aran Benllyn is a subsidiary summit of Aran Fawddwy in southern Snowdonia, North Wales, Wales, United Kingdom. It is the second highest peak in the Aran mountain range.

It rises from the south shore of Llyn Tegid, and tops the northern point on the main Aran ridge. In between it and Aran Fawddwy lies another summit: Erw y Ddafad-ddu.

The summit has a few rocky outcrops and is marked by a small cairn. The view include: Llyn Tegid to the north, Foel y Geifr to the east, Erw y Ddafad-ddu to the south and Rhobell Fawr and Cadair Idris to the west.

North-east of the summit is a lake, Llyn Lliwbran.

References

External links
www.geograph.co.uk : photos of Aran Fawddwy and surrounding area

Hewitts of Wales
Nuttalls
Mountains and hills of Snowdonia
Mountains and hills of Gwynedd
Llanuwchllyn